The Hirske coal mine is a large coal mine located in the south-east of Ukraine in Hirske, Luhansk Oblast. Hirske represents one of the largest coal reserves in Ukraine having estimated reserves of 46.5 million tonnes. The annual coal production is around 320,000 tonnes.

In 1980, 66 miners and two rescue workers died in an accident at the Hirske mine.

See also 

 Coal in Ukraine
 List of mines in Ukraine

References 

Coal mines in Ukraine
Economy of Luhansk Oblast
Coal mines in the Soviet Union